Boracay (often locally shortened to Bora) is a resort island in the Western Visayas region of the Philippines, located  off the northwest coast of Panay.

Boracay was originally inhabited by the Tumandok and Ati people, but commercial development has led to their severe marginalization since the 1970s.

 
Apart from its white sand beaches, Boracay is also famous for being one of the world's top destinations for relaxation. , it was emerging among the top destinations for tranquility and nightlife.

Boracay was awarded as the 2012 Best Island in the World by the international travel magazine Travel + Leisure. In 2014, the resort island was at the top of the "Best Islands in the World" list published by the international magazine Condé Nast Traveler. In 2016, Boracay headed the magazine's list of "Top 10 destinations to watch".

In April 2018, the Philippine government under former president Rodrigo Duterte decreed a six-month closure of the island for tourists to undertake major renovation works, especially of the sewage system, which had become obsolete and insufficient. The island was administered by the Boracay Inter-agency Task Force during the closure,  then it re-opened in October 2018, with a set of new rules meant to address a variety of issues.

Etymology
The name Boracay is attributed to different origins. The island's indigenous Ati people say that the name of the island came from the Inati words "bora", meaning bubbles, and "bocay", meaning white. Another theory says that the name is derived from the local word "borac" which means "white cotton," a reference to the color and texture of Boracay's white sugary and powdery sand. Yet another version dating back to the Spanish era says the name is derived from "sagay", the word for a shell, and "boray", the word for seed.

History

Pre-colonial period
Before the Spanish colonization of the Philippines in the 16th century, Boracay was populated by Ati people. It was known to the Iberian conquerors as Buracay. At the time of contact with the Europeans, Buracay had a population of one hundred people, who cultivated rice on the island and augmented their income by raising goats.

The Tumandok people also established an indigenous presence on the island, although the identities of the two indigenous peoples is often conflated.

Contemporary period

As an agricultural island
Boracay was previously part of the province of Capiz. It was under the jurisdiction of the town of Buruanga until the municipality of Malay was established on June 15, 1949. The municipality, as well as the island, became part of Aklan, which became an independent province on April 25, 1956.

Before the advent of tourism, Boracay was largely an agricultural community. Around 1900 A.D., Sofía Gonzáles Tirol and her husband Lamberto Hontiveros Tirol (a town judge on the Panay mainland) took ownership of substantial properties on the island from „Orang“ Sacapaño. They planted coconuts, fruit trees and greenery. Others followed the Tirols, and cultivation and development of the island gradually spread. The production of copra and fishing were major industries in the island.

However, due to overharvesting by fishers and the destruction of coral reef due to cyanide fishing, the fishing industry saw a decline. By the 1980s, the price of copra had declined, encouraging tourism as an alternative source of income for the island.

In 1978, President Ferdinand Marcos issued a proclamation naming Boracay among a number of islands, coves and peninsulas declared as tourist zones.

Influx of tourism (1970s to 1997)

Tourism came to the island beginning sometime in the 1970s. In 1970, the movies Nam's Angels (released in the U.S. as The Losers) and Too Late the Hero used filming locations on Boracay and Caticlan. There was an influx of Western tourists after German writer Jens Peter called it "paradise on Earth" in his book about the Philippines in 1978. In the 1980s, the island became popular as a budget destination for backpackers. By the 1990s, Boracay's beaches were being acclaimed as the best in the world. However, in 1997, tourist arrivals to the resort island dropped 60 percent due to the increase of coliform bacteria from poor sewage and septic systems on the island.

1997 to 2018

The condition of Boracay in 1997 led to the installment of a potable water supply system and a sewage treatment plant and a solid waste disposal system in Boracay which was operated by the Philippine Tourism Authority (PTA). The environmental concerns persisted due to noncompliance of numerous business establishments.

Then-president Gloria Macapagal Arroyo declared Boracay a Special Tourism Zone in 2005, and in April 2006 she gave the PTA administrative control over the island while mandating the agency to coordinate with the provincial government of Aklan.

In 2012, the Philippine Department of Tourism reported that Boracay had been named the world's second best beach after Providenciales in the Turks and Caicos Islands.

2018 closure and rehabilitation

Due to worsening environmental conditions in Boracay, President Rodrigo Duterte in February 2018 said he planned to close the resort island, which he described as a "cesspool", on April 26, 2018, instructing Environment and Natural Resources Secretary Roy Cimatu to resolve the issue. In a cabinet meeting, President Duterte approved the full closure of the island for six months, effective April 26, 2018, to rehabilitate and resolve the environmental issues surrounding Boracay. On May 30, 2018, President Duterte declared that he planned to make the entire Boracay a land reform area and wanted to first prioritize the island's residents.

In April 2018, the Philippine Army's 301st Infantry Brigade confirmed that 200 soldiers were deployed to Boracay to secure the island during its shutdown starting April 26.

On October 26, 2018, Boracay was reopened to the public with work on the island's infrastructure still in progress. In April 2019, numerous Chinese-owned businesses were opened in Boracay, and additionally, there are about 300 mainland Chinese residents. In April 2019, Labor Secretary Silvestre Bello III said that the Department of Labor and Employment has no control over foreign businesses setting up shop on the island, but that it vows to ensure that no Chinese national could take jobs fit for Filipinos.

2020 COVID-19 pandemic 
The municipality of Malay, including Boracay island, was closed to tourism effective March 19, 2020, in response to the COVID-19 pandemic. The island would eventually be re-opened to tourists with COVID-19 protocols implemented as cautionary measure.

Geography

South-facing Cagban Beach is located across a small strait from the jetty port at Caticlan on Panay island, and the Cagban jetty port serves as Boracay's main entry and exit point during most of the year. When wind and sea conditions dictate, east-facing Tambisaan Beach serves as an alternative entry and exit point.
Boracay's two primary tourism beaches, White Beach and Bulabog Beach, are located on opposite sides of the island's narrow central area. White Beach faces westward and Bulabog Beach faces eastward. The island also has several other beaches.

In the central portion, for about two kilometers, there is a footpath known as the Beachfront Path separating the beach itself from the establishments located along it. North and south of the Beachfront Path, beachfront establishments do literally front along the beach itself. Several roads and paths connect the Beachfront Path with Boracay's Main Road, a vehicular road which runs the length of the island. At the extreme northern end of White Beach, a footpath runs around the headland there and connects White Beach with Diniwid Beach.

Bulabog Beach, across the island from White Beach, is the second most popular tourism beach on the island and Boracay's main windsurfing and kiteboarding area.

Governance
The whole of Boracay island is under the jurisdiction of the town of Malay of Aklan province. There are three barangays in Boracay; Balabag, Manoc-Manoc, and Yapak.

Climate

Weather in Boracay is generally divided into two seasonal weather patterns known locally as the Amihan and Habagat seasons. In the Visayan language, Amihan means a cool northeast wind, and Habagat means west or southwest wind; southwest monsoon.
The Amihan season is characterized by moderate temperatures, little or no rainfall, and a prevailing wind from the northeast. The Habagat season is characterized by hot and humid weather, frequent heavy rainfall, and a prevailing wind from the west.

On Boracay, the main indicator of the switch between the Amihan and Habagat seasonal patterns is the switch in wind direction. In most years this transition is abrupt and occurs overnight. In some years there is a period of perhaps a week or two where the wind will switch between Amihan and Habagat patterns several times before settling into the pattern for the new season. As a rule of thumb, Boracay will be in the Amihan weather pattern from sometime in October to sometime in March and in the Habagat weather pattern for the remainder of the year.

During Tropical storm periods, temperatures can fall below . Tropical storms can impact Boracay at any time of year, but are most likely to be seen during the Habagat season.

Environment

The rapid growth of tourism has caused environmental damage on the island. Condé Nast Traveler magazine called Boracay "the poster child for overtourism". The Daily Telegraph called Boracay an "island paradise ruined by tourism".

Fauna

At least three species of flying foxes have been recorded to inhabit Boracay namely the giant golden-crowned flying fox (Aceradon jubatus), the giant fruit bat (Pteropus vampyrus), and the small flying fox (Pteropus hypomelanus). Their population is concentrated on the northern side of the island in Barangay Yapak, where the hunting of bats was made illegal through a local ordinance.

According to the Coastal Ecosystem Conservation and Adaptive Management (CECAM), a study led by the Japan International Cooperation Agency conducted from 2010 to 2015 noted a 70.5 percent decrease of Boracay's coral cover from 1988 to 2011. The study attributed the increased drop in coral cover from 2008 to 2011 to the 38.4 percent increase of tourist arrivals combined with poorly monitored snorkeling activity in coral-rich areas. The Boracay Foundation Inc. (BFI) made efforts to remedy the situation by launching a "refurbishment" program for the corals. In 2017, the BFI claimed the number of corals in Boracay increased from 15 to 20 percent since 2015 due to its project.

Sanitation

Boracay has been experiencing an increased coliform bacteria population since the 1990s, which contributed to a 60 percent decline in tourist arrivals in 1997. Although a potable water supply system, a solid waste disposal system, as well as a sewage treatment plant which began operation in 2003 were installed to remedy the insufficient sewage and septic conditions in the island, environmental concerns regarding coliform bacteria persisted due to noncompliance of some business establishments in the island.

In 2004, only 51 percent of hotels and restaurants in Boracay and 25 percent of all households were connected to the island's central sewage system. In 2005, Boracay was declared a "special tourism zone". In April 2006, Arroyo gave the PTA administrative control over Boracay, to be exercised in coordination with the provincial government. In 2009, Boracay Island Water Co. (BIWC), won a contract to improve the supply of potable water and install an efficient sewerage system.

Boracay has experienced abnormally high algae growth since February 2015, due to sewage being dumped into the waters surrounding the islands. In early 2018, 50 to 60 percent of all establishments in Boracay were compliant to the Clean Water Act of 2004 according to the Department of Environment and Natural Resources.

Tourism

Partly because of its wind and weather patterns, tourism in Boracay is at its peak during the amihan season (which generally starts around the Christmas season and runs through February). During amihan, the prevailing wind blows from the east. Boracay's main tourism area, White Beach, is on the western side of the island and is sheltered from the wind. During the Amihan season, the water off White Beach is often glassy-smooth. On the eastern side of the island, hills on the northern and southern ends of the island channel the Amihan season wind from the east onshore, onto Bulabog Beach in the central part of the island's eastern side. This makes the reef-protected waters off that beach relatively safe and ideal for scuba diving, windsurfing, and kiteboarding / kitesurfing.

In June 2011, it was reported that Megaworld Corporation, a real estate development group led by Andrew Tan had earmarked  to develop tourism estates in Boracay and Cavite. The planned Boracay project, Boracay Newcoast, involves four hotels with 1,500 rooms, a plaza and an entertainment center.

Other resorts in Boracay include Discovery Shores, a luxury five-star resort managed by a Filipino hospitality group called The Discovery Leisure Company Inc. and owned by Discovery World Corp. The building, with 88 suites, a spa, and four restaurants and bars, stands at Station One on the White Beach, and has been described as "more Miami chic than hidden oasis."

The island has the highest density of merchants that accept bitcoin outside of El Salvador. There is a movement to dub the island "Bitcoin Island" and bootstrap a circular economy similar to Bitcoin Beach.

Leisure activities
Leisure activities available on or near Boracay include horseback riding, scuba diving, diving helmet, snorkeling, windsurfing, kiteboarding, cliff diving, parasailing.

Boracay is the site of an 18-hole par 72 golf course designed by Graham Marsh. In addition, Boracay has in excess of 350 beach resorts offering more than 2,000 rooms ranging in quality from five-star to budget accommodation. In addition, Boracay offers a wide range of restaurants, bars, pubs, and nightclubs.

A landmark natural rock formation, Boracay's Rock, juts prominently directly in front of Willy's Beach Resort.

Statistics
According to the Department of Tourism of the Philippines, there was a recorded 1,725,483 visitors to Boracay in 2016. This was an increase of 250,000 from the previous year. Assuming the average length of stay of tourists to Boracay is three days, the number of tourists on the island each day was calculated at 14,182. According to Malay municipal records more than two million tourists visited the island in 2017.

Sports

Boracay has been a competitive venue for the Asian Windsurfing Tour, with the week-long Boracay International Funboard Cup competition usually held in January on Bulabog Beach. . CNNGo, a division of CNN focused on travel/lifestyle/entertainment, selected the Boracay International Funboard Competition on the weekend of January 22–24 as one of its 52 weekend recommendations for 2010.

Dragon boat races are held annually on Boracay under the auspices of the Philippine Dragon Boat Federation, with teams coming from around the Philippines and from other Asian nations to compete. The races usually take place sometime in April or May. The 2012 Boracay Edition of the PDBF International Club Crew Challenge to was scheduled for April 26–28, in 2012.

The Boracay Open Asian Beach Ultimate Tournament, an ultimate frisbee event, with players coming from around the Philippines and from other International nations, has been held annually since 2003, usually in March or April.

Asian Games Centennial Festival 
Boracay was scheduled to host a special multi-sport event in 2013. At its 31st General Assembly in Macau, the Olympic Council of Asia (OCA) decided to create the Asian Games Centennial Festival in celebration of the 100th anniversary of the Oriental Games (later Far Eastern Championship Games). OCA awarded the hosting rights to the Philippines as it had been the host of the first Far Eastern Championship Games held in Manila 100 years earlier. The festival was to be held on Boracay in November 2013. However, it had to be rescheduled and relocated because of Typhoon Haiyan, with the ceremony eventually taking place at the Sofitel Plaza in Manila on January 17, 2014. The 32nd OCA General Assembly was to be held in conjunction with the games.

Culture

The first settlers of Boracay were a Negrito people called the Ati, and who spoke a distinctive Philippine language called Inati. Later settlers brought other languages to the island, including Aklanon (as Boracay is part of Aklan province), Hiligaynon (Ilonggo), Kinaray-a, Capiznon, other Visayan languages, Filipino, and English.

The well-known Ati-Atihan Festival takes place each January in Kalibo on nearby Panay Island. A much smaller Ati-Atihan festival is celebrated on Boracay, usually in the second or third week of January.

Transportation

Boracay island is separated from Panay island by a narrow strait. The island is located opposite the barangay of Caticlan in the municipality of Malay, Aklan. Transportation across the strait is provided by boats operating from the Caticlan jetty port. Cagban Port serves as the primary sea transportation hub for passengers going into Boracay but the island lacks any formal seaport for cargo transport and waste disposal. Goods are delivered into Boracay through an informal port near the Cagban Port.

Boracay is served by two airports in Aklan: the Kalibo International Airport and Godofredo P. Ramos Airport (commonly referred to as the Caticlan airport).

The three main modes of transport are via motor-tricycles and electric-tricycles (e-trikes) along the main road, or by walking along the beaches. Pedicabs, known as sikads, are also available along the Beachfront Path. Other means of transportation include mountain bikes, quadbikes and motorbikes, all of which can be rented. It was reported in October 2018 that the island will see modern jeepneys, solar-powered shuttles, and hop-on hop-off buses serviced by Grab, and that the Department of Energy will donate 200 e-trikes to the Malay local government under a  project funded by the Asian Development Bank.

The municipal government of Malay is currently encouraging motorcycle operators to transition to e-trikes in their coordinated efforts to promote environment-friendly public transportation. Diesel-motor tricycles are expected to be phased out by August 2018.

Awards and recognition 
Boracay Island earned the eighth spot in the annual Condé Nast Traveler (CNT) readers' choice awards for top islands to visit this 2021.

See also

Tourism in the Philippines

Notes

References

Further reading
 
 
 
 Beyond the Beach: Balancing Environmental and Socio-cultural Sustainability in Boracay, the Philippines, by Lei Tin Jackie Ong, Donovan Storey and John Minnery. Tourism Geographies, Volume 13, 2011.

External links

Official Boracay Tourism website 

 
Beaches of the Philippines